Kenny Washington (born May 29, 1958) is an American jazz drummer born in Staten Island, New York. His brother is bassist Reggie Washington.

He grew up in the Stapleton Houses and attended P.S. 14.  He studied at The High School of Music & Art, graduating in 1976. He has worked with Ronnie Mathews, Lee Konitz, Betty Carter, Johnny Griffin, Dizzy Gillespie, Clark Terry, George Cables, Benny Goodman, Lionel Hampton, Ahmad Jamal, Sonny Stitt, James Spaulding, Phil Woods, Bill Charlap, Bobby Watson, Curtis Lundy, and Tommy Flanagan. Washington serves on the faculty of SUNY Purchase and The Juilliard School.

Discography

As sideman 
With Ruby Braff
Cape Codfather (Arbors, 2000)
In the Wee, Small Hours in London and New York (Arbors, 2000)
Music for the Still of the Night (Arbors, 2001)

With Joshua Breakstone
Self-Portrait in Swing (Contemporary, 1989)
9 by 3 (Contemporary, 1991)
Walk Don't Run (King, 1992)
This Just In (Double-Time, 1999)

With Kenny Burrell
Generation (Blue Note, 1987)
Pieces of Blue and the Blues (Blue Note, 1988)
With George Cables
Cables Fables (SteepleChase, 1991)
With Benny Carter
Harlem Renaissance (MusicMasters, 1992)
With Bill Charlap
All Through the Night (Criss Cross, 1998)
Written in the Stars (Blue Note, 2000)
S'Wonderful (Venus, 2002)
Stardust (Blue Note, 2002)
Somewhere: The Songs of Leonard Bernstein (Blue Note, 2004)
Plays George Gershwin: The American Soul (Blue Note, 2005)
Live at the Village Vanguard (Blue Note, 2007)
The Silver Lining: The Songs of Jerome Kern, Tony Bennett/Bill Charlap (Columbia/Sony Music, 2015)
Notes from New York (Impulse!, 2016)
With Teddy Edwards and Houston Person
Horn to Horn (Muse, 1996) – recorded in 1994
Close Encounters (HighNote, 1999) – recorded in 1994
With Dizzy Gillespie
Bird Songs: The Final Recordings (Telarc, 1992)
To Diz with Love (Telarc, 1992)
To Bird with Love (Telarc, 1992)
With Benny Green
The Place To Be (Blue Note, 1994)
With Buck Hill
The Buck Stops Here (Muse, 1992)
With Plas Johnson and Red Holloway
Keep That Groove Going! (Milestone, 2001)
With Randy Johnston
Walk On (Muse, 1992)
With Etta Jones
My Buddy: Etta Jones Sings the Songs of Buddy Johnson (HighNote, 1998)
All the Way (HighNote, 1999)
With Lee Konitz 
Lee Konitz Nonet (Chiaroscuro, 1977)
Jazz Nocturne (Venus/Evidence, 1994)
With Jimmy McGriff
Feelin' It (Milestone, 2001)
With Jane Monheit
In the Sun (2002)
Live at the Rainbow Room (2003)

With Mingus Dynasty
Live at the Village Vanguard (1984)
Mingus' Sounds of Love (1988)
Reincarnation (1997)
With Ralph Moore
Round Trip (Reservoir, 1985 [1987])
Images (Landmark, 1989)
Furthermore (Landmark, 1990)
With David "Fathead" Newman
Davey Blue (HighNote, 2002)
With Hod O'Brien
Ridin' High (1990)
So That's How It Is (1998)
Live at Blues Alley: First Set (2005)
Live at Blues Alley: Second Set (2006)
Live at Blues Alley: Third Set (2007)
With Houston Person
Person-ified (HighNote, 1997)
My Romance (HighNote, 1998)
With Melvin Rhyne
The Legend (1991)
Boss Organ (1993)
Mel's Spell (1996)
Stick to the Kick (1997)
Kojo (1999)
Classmasters (2000)
Tomorrow Yesterday Today (2004)
With Wallace Roney
Munchin' (Muse, 1993)
Crunchin' (Muse, 1993)
With Charlie Rouse
 Social Call (Uptown, 1984) with Red Rodney
With Randy Sandke
Awakening (1998)
Cliffhanger (2003)
The Subway Ballet (2006)
With James Spaulding
Brilliant Corners (Muse, 1988)
Escapade (HighNote, 1999)
With Larry Willis
Just in Time (SteepleChase, 1989)
With Michael Weiss
Presenting Michael Weiss (Criss Cross, 1986)
With others
 1983 Call It Whachawana, Johnny Griffin (Galaxy)
 1983 Two at the Top,  Frank Wess and Johnny Coles (Uptown) 
 1985 Means of Identification, Valery Ponomarev (Reservoir)
 1988 Superblue, Superblue (Blue Note)
 1989 Here's to My Lady, Phil Woods
 1989 Jazz Poet, Tommy Flanagan
 1989 My Man Benny, My Man Phil, Benny Carter and Phil Woods (MusicMasters)
 1991 What's New, Walter Bishop Jr. (DIW)
 1991 Live at the Village Gate, Clark Terry
 1992 Ann Hampton Callaway, Ann Hampton Callaway
 1992 I Remember Clifford, Arturo Sandoval
 1992 Crazy for You, John Hicks (Red Baron)
 1992 Downtown Sounds, Grant Stewart (Criss Cross)
 1993 Caracas, Lou Donaldson
 1993 Joshua Redman, Joshua Redman
 1995 Burnin' in the Woodhouse, Milt Jackson
 1997 Back in New York, Doug Raney
 1999 Le Grand Freddy, Freddy Cole
 2000 Blue Suite, Gary Smulyan
 2000 Excursions, Jim Rotondi
 2001 Feelin' It, Jimmy McGriff
 2001 The Promise Land, Cedar Walton (HighNote)
 2005 Back in New York, Scott Hamilton
 2005 Mean What You Say, Eddie Daniels
 2007 Ain't Necessarily So, Andy Bey
 2008 Boss Bones, Wycliffe Gordon
 2009 A Quiet Time, Ahmad Jamal
 2010 For the Love of You, Joe Locke

References

External links
Online discography

1958 births
The High School of Music & Art alumni
Hard bop musicians
American jazz drummers
Living people
African-American jazz musicians
People from Staten Island
20th-century American drummers
American male drummers
Jazz musicians from New York (state)
20th-century American male musicians
American male jazz musicians
Dameronia members
Mingus Dynasty (band) members
Superblue (band) members
20th-century African-American musicians
21st-century African-American people